Heraeum  or Heraion, also known as Heraion Teichos (Ἡραῖον τεῖχος) was a Greek city in ancient Thrace, located on the Propontis, a little to the east of Bisanthe. The city was a Samian colony and founded around 600 BC. In some of the Itineraries, the place is called Hiereum or Ereon.

Herodotus, Demosthenes, Harpokration, Stephanus of Byzantium and Suda mention the city.

In 352 BCE Phillip II besieged the city. Athens decided to send a fleet of forty triremes and to levy sixty talents in order to help the city, but the fleet never set sail. Only later a much smaller fleet of ten ships and money of five talents were sent. But Philip captured the city.

Its site is near Aytepe, in Turkey.

See also
Greek colonies in Thrace

References

Populated places in ancient Thrace
Greek colonies in Thrace
Former populated places in Turkey
Ancient Greek archaeological sites in Turkey
Archaeological sites in the Aegean Region
Samian colonies
History of Tekirdağ Province